Events from the year 1018 in the Kingdom of Scotland.

Incumbents
Monarch — Malcolm II

Events 
 Battle of Carham results in a victory for the Kingdom of Scotland and establishes the River Tweed as the southern border of the kingdom

References

 
11th century in Scotland